Bent may refer to:

Places
 Bent, Iran, a city in Sistan and Baluchestan Province, Iran
 Bent District, an administrative subdivision of Iran
 Bent, Netherlands, a village in the municipality of Rijnwoude, the Netherlands
 Bent County, Colorado, United States
 Bents, Saskatchewan, an unincorporated community in Canada
 Bent's Old Fort National Historic Site, frontier trading post, in La Junta, Colorado

Arts and entertainment
 Bent (play), a 1979 play by Martin Sherman
 Bent (1997 film), a 1997 film by Sean Mathias based on the play
 Bent (2018 film)
 Bent (TV series), an NBC romantic television comedy series
 Bent (band), an electronica duo from England
 '"Bent" (song), a 2000 song by Matchbox Twenty
 Bent (magazine), a UK magazine
 Bent (album), a 2012 album by Ssion
 Bent, a 2019 album by Stonefield

Science
 Bent molecular geometry, in chemistry
 Bent's rule, about atomic orbital hybridization
 Bent grass or bent, the plant genus Agrostis

People
 Bent Fabric (1924–2020), Danish composer
 Bent Flyvbjerg (born 1952), Danish economic geographer
 Bent Larsen (1935–2010), Danish chess grandmaster
 Bent Mejding (born 1937), Danish actor
 Bent Melchior (1929–2021), Danish rabbi

Other uses
 Bent (surname)
 Bent (structural), a repeated cross-sectional sub-structure of a frame
 Bent, the insignia of the engineering honor society Tau Beta Pi

See also
 Bend (disambiguation)

Danish masculine given names